Anna Skolarczyk (born 8 November 1956) is a Polish former breaststroke swimmer. She competed in two events at the 1976 Summer Olympics.

References

External links
 

1956 births
Living people
Polish female breaststroke swimmers
Olympic swimmers of Poland
Swimmers at the 1976 Summer Olympics
Universiade medalists in swimming
Sportspeople from Tarnów
Universiade bronze medalists for Poland
Medalists at the 1977 Summer Universiade
Medalists at the 1979 Summer Universiade
20th-century Polish women
21st-century Polish women